70 athletes (60 men and 10 women) from Russia competed at the 1996 Summer Paralympics in Atlanta, United States.

Medallists

See also
Russia at the Paralympics
Russia at the 1996 Summer Olympics

References 

Nations at the 1996 Summer Paralympics
1996
Paralympics